WKZC (94.9 FM) is a radio station broadcasting a country music format. Licensed to Scottville, Michigan, the Federal Communications Commission assigned the call letters of WKZC on June 21, 1982. WKZC (KZ 96) took to the air February 16, 1983, as a 3,000-watt station at 95.9 MHz owned by Kathy Ziehm/West Shore Broadcasting.  In 1993, the station was purchased by Chickering Associates, bringing it into current ownership with longtime competitors WKLA-AM/FM, and moved to its current frequency.  WKZC and the WKLA stations were sold to Lake Michigan Broadcasting in 1996.

WKZC transmits from a 364-foot tower in Mason County's Hamlin Township. The station broadcasts from the Synergy Media studios at 5941 US-10 in Ludington. WKZC operates as "The Big Dog 949" playing country music. In 2012, Lake Michigan Broadcasting sold all of its stations to Synergy Media and Synergy operated the stations from July 1, 2012. On June 19, 2013, the licenses were officially transferred to Synergy Media at a price of $580,000.

References
Michiguide.com - WKZC History

External links

KZC
Radio stations established in 1983